Akashadoothu is a 1993 Indian Malayalam family drama film directed by Sibi Malayil and written by Dennis Joseph, with Madhavi and Murali in the lead roles. The film tells the tale of a woman suffering from leukemia. The plot of the film was inspired from the 1983 American film Who Will Love My Children?.

The film was critically acclaimed and became a blockbuster and was the highest grossing Malayalam film at the time of release. The film ran for over 365 days in theatres. One of the most influential melodramas of the 1990s in Malayalam, the film won the National Film Award for Best Film on Family Welfare. Madhavi won Kerala State Film Award for Second Best Actress and Filmfare Award for Best Actress. The film was remade in Telugu as Matrudevobhava, in Kannada as Karulina Koogu, in Marathi as Chimani Pakhare and in Hindi as Tulsi. 

The film achieved cult status in the years following its release and regarded as one of the best emotional drama films in Malayalam cinema. A serial on Surya TV with the same name Akashadoothu was made as a sequel to the film.

Plot
The story revolves around Johnny and Annie, a married couple who had both grown up together in an orphanage. They fell in love and got married. The couple have four children; the eldest being a teenage girl named Meenu, twin boys Rony and Tony, and the youngest Monu, a toddler. Rony and Tony are about 8 years old and are very close to each other. Rony is physically handicapped. Johnny is a jeep driver by profession and Annie a violin teacher. Though the family struggles to live and make ends meet, they lead a happy life together, except for the moments when Johnny, a recurrent alcoholic spends most of his daily earnings at the local toddy shop. During an altercation between Johnny and the local milk delivery man Keshavan, the latter is humiliated in front of his family. Keshavan therefore decides to take revenge on Johnny.

One day, he sees Johnny's son Tony riding a bicycle on his way home. Keshavan increases the speed of the van he is driving and knocks Tony off the road. Some bystanders bring the injured Tony to the hospital. Despite being in a not so critical condition, Tony has lost a lot of blood and requires blood transfusion. While looking for suitable donors, it is discovered that Annie's blood sample has some abnormal characteristics and she cannot donate her blood. After further analysis, it is revealed that Annie is suffering from a late stage of leukaemia and that she only has a couple of months to a year to live. The news shocks both Johnny and Annie. Johnny reforms from his alcoholic demeanor and becomes more responsible. However, as fate takes a turn, one day when Johnny is on his way home with medicine for Annie, he gets into a fight with Keshavan and is killed. Annie is devastated but remains strong willed to take care of the family. She deeply worries about the future of her children. She does not want her children to grow up in an orphanage like she and Johnny did, growing up with the label as orphans. She decides to give her children up for adoption. She lies to her kids that the money she gets out of her classes is not sufficient for them to live and therefore she is going to Germany very soon, so they have to go to new houses and there will be new parents to love and take care of them. By now Meenu has come to know about her mother's condition and asks her about it. Annie is totally broken down. Both of them keeps this a secret between them.

Annie, with the help of the priest of their church – Father Vattappara – makes arrangements for the adoption of the kids. Monu is adopted by a leading Doctor. Annie wishes that both her boys Rony and Tony live together forever and hence expects a couple to adopt both of them. But they find it difficult to get people ready to accept the disabled boy. Finally, Annie decides to give Tony to a wealthy businessman and his wife. Meenu decides not to go to a new house and be with her Mum, but Annie and Father Vattappara convince her for the same. She is taken by a rich old man and his wife to their home. The only one left is Rony, the handicapped child. Annie and father Vattappara try hard to find someone to take care of him. Mean time Annie's doctor give her a hint that days are counted for her. She wishes to celebrate Christmas at her home with her kids and makes arrangements for it. She writes a letter to Meenu asking her to always keep in touch with her brothers so that the bond between the siblings remains forever. On the day before Christmas, Annie dreams that all her children have come to see her. She wakes up and happily runs to the door, only to realise that was a dream. She starts bleeding from her nose and understands that there isn't much time left for her, she prays in front of the Crucifix begging for a day more to live so that she can see her kids for the last time. She finds real blood flowing from the wounds of Jesus in the Cross and realises that death has come for her. Later that night Rony finds her dead.

At her funeral, all her children and their newly adopted parents are there and after she is buried, the children and their families tearfully part ways, except for Rony who is about to be taken by Father Vattappara to the orphanage. The movie ends with Tony's adopted parents coming back, and Tony jumps out of the car and runs to Rony and the two embracing each other, as Tony's adopted father was moved during the farewell and agreed to take in Rony as well.

Cast

 Madhavi as Annie
 Murali as Johnny
 Seena Antony as Meenu
 Ben K Alexander as Monu
 Martin Korah as Rony
 Joseph Antony as Tony
 Kuthiravattam Pappu as Chaandy
 Prem Prakash as Doctor
 Subair as Dr.David
 Nedumudi Venu as Fr.Vattappara
 Jagathy Sreekumar as Chemmachen
 Jose Prakash as Father
 Aaranmulla Ponnamma as Annaamma
 Thikkurissy
 Suvarna Mathew as Mini
 KPAC Lalitha as Annaamma's sister
 N. F. Varghese as Paalkkaran (Milkman) Keshavan
 Jose Pellissery as Vargese
 Bindu Panicker as Marikungu
 Indrans as Driver

Awards
National Film Awards
Best Film on Family Welfare

Kerala State Film Awards
 Second Best Actress: Madhavi
 Best Singer: K. J. Yesudas
 Best Child Artist: Seena Antony

Filmfare Awards South
 Best Malayalam Actress: Madhavi

Casting
Geetha was initially approached to play the lead female role. She rejected the role citing date conflicts and eventually Madhavi was finalised for the role.

Sequel serial
As a sequel to the movie, a serial with the same name started on 24 October 2011 on Surya TV. 

Chippi played the character of Madhavi's daughter named 'Meenu'. Apart from her, K. P. A. C. Lalitha, Sukumari, Prem Prakash, Seema G. Nair played the lead roles. The song in the film 'Raapaadee Kezhunnuvo...' was used as the title song of the serial with the film clips as visuals. The story of the serial revolves around the reunion of the 4 siblings (Meenu, Ronnie, Tony & Monu). Also, they showed Jose Prakash in a special appearance on 25 Jan 2012, 26 Jan 2012 and, 17 Feb 2012. The serial ended on 4 October 2013 with a total of 501 episodes. The serial was produced by Chippi.

 Cast
Chippy Renjith 
K. P. A. C. Lalitha
Sukumari
Shiju
Vineeth
Prem Prakash 
Jose Prakash
Seema G. Nair 
Meera Krishna
Sharika Menon
Vishnu Prakash
Raghavan
Rajesh Hebbar
Aadithyan Jayan
Anil Murali
Ambika Mohan
Priyanka Nair
Seema
Geetha Nair
Manju Satheesh
Vishnu Prakash
Suresh Kumar
J. Pallassery
Sonia
Vanitha Krishnachandran
Archana Menon

Reception
The film was both commercial and critical success. In 2019, Aradhya Kurup of The News Minute wrote, "After the first watch where I cried enough to get a headache, I never expected to have the same unsettling effect the second time round, that too after a few years. But I did. I howled for the same scenes – when the mom gives away her children, one by one, and their heart wrenching reactions to it. God help me!"

Soundtrack
The soundtrack of the film features 4 songs, written by O. N. V. Kurup and composed by Ouseppachan.

References

External links
 

1990s Malayalam-language films
Films scored by Ouseppachan
Indian films about cancer
Malayalam films remade in other languages
Films directed by Sibi Malayil
Indian drama films
Indian family films
Films with screenplays by Dennis Joseph
Best Film on Family Welfare National Film Award winners
1993 drama films
1993 films